Libya competed at the 2020 Summer Olympics in Tokyo. Originally scheduled to take place from 24 July to 9 August 2020, the Games were postponed to 23 July to 8 August 2021, because of the COVID-19 pandemic. It was the nation's twelfth appearance at the Summer Olympics since its debut at the 1964 Summer Olympics in Tokyo; seven of them were represented by the Libyan athletes under the name Libyan Arab Jamahiriya.

Competitors
The following is the list of number of competitors in the Games.

Athletics

Libya received a universality slot from the World Athletics to send a female track and field athlete to the Olympics.

Track & road events

Judo

Libya qualified one judoka for the men's heavyweight category (+100 kg) at the Games. Ali Omar accepted a continental berth from Africa as the nation's top-ranked judoka outside of direct qualifying position in the IJF World Ranking List of June 28, 2021.

Rowing

Libya qualified one boat in the men's single sculls for the Games by topping the field in the B-final and securing the last of five berths available at the 2019 FISA African Olympic Qualification Regatta in Tunis, Tunisia.

Qualification Legend: FA=Final A (medal); FB=Final B (non-medal); FC=Final C (non-medal); FD=Final D (non-medal); FE=Final E (non-medal); FF=Final F (non-medal); SA/B=Semifinals A/B; SC/D=Semifinals C/D; SE/F=Semifinals E/F; QF=Quarterfinals; R=Repechage

Swimming

Libya received a universality invitation from FINA to send a top-ranked male swimmer in his respective individual events to the Olympics, based on the FINA Points System of June 28, 2021.

References

Nations at the 2020 Summer Olympics
2020
2020 in Libyan sport